Tropic of Fear is a Nancy Drew and Hardy Boys Supermystery crossover novel, issued under the Carolyn Keene pseudonym. It was published in 1992.

Plot summary
Nancy Drew is at the Grand Hawaiian Hotel in Hawaii, enjoying a vacation. She finds a man on the ground near her jeep, covered in blood and dead from a bullet wound. Nancy suspects motives of greed, corruption, and scandalous behaviour are involved. Meanwhile, a flood of cases involving a band of art thieves leads the Hardys to Waikiki, Hawaii, where they meet Nancy. Now, they must work together to wrap the case up, and find the prime suspect.

References

External links
Supermystery series books

Supermystery
1992 American novels
1992 children's books
Novels set in Hawaii